Thai Labour Museum is a museum in Ratchathewi District, Bangkok, Thailand.

External links
 Information about the museum

Museums in Bangkok
History museums in Thailand